Järfälla Municipality is a municipality in Stockholm County in east central Sweden, and is considered a suburb of Stockholm. Its seat is located in Jakobsberg, part of the Stockholm urban area.

Järfälla has not been amalgamated with other municipalities in the two local government reforms carried out during the 20th century. The Stäket area in the north was, however, added in 1952.

It is located about 20 km north of Stockholm, with a part situated by the shore of Lake Mälaren. It takes about 20 minutes to reach downtown Stockholm by Stockholm commuter rail.

History 
Järfälla traces its history to the Stone Age and has some ruins from that time. After being Christianized in the 11th century, a church was built around the year 1200 that still stands today. Järfälla continued to be of some importance in the Middle Ages as several important roads went through it. Furthermore, the centre of the hundred was located within the boundaries of the municipality from 1675 to 1905

Its coat of arms, which depicts a golden lamb carrying an archbishop's cross, can be traced from 1568, but was created in 1955. They may symbolize that Järfälla is situated on the road from the capital Stockholm to the seat of the archbishop in the nearby city of Uppsala.

The main population expansion came in the 1930s and 1940s, when many residential houses were built in the seat Jakobsberg for middle-class families commuting to Stockholm.

Public transportation 
The municipality is served by the Stockholm public transport system. There are three Stockholm commuter rail stations, Barkarby, Jakobsberg and Kallhäll, as well as a bus network. As part of a larger plan for the Stockholm region, Barkarby station and Barkarbystaden will get metro stations, scheduled to open in 2026. The representatives for the municipalities signed the deal in January 2014, and on 3 March 2014 Järfälla municipal council made the formal decision to fulfill their part of the deal.

Demography

Residents with a foreign background 
On 31 December 2017 the number of people with a foreign background (persons born outside of Sweden or with two parents born outside of Sweden) was 31,031, or 40.59% of the population (76,453 on 31 December 2017). On 31 December 2002 the number of residents with a foreign background was (per the same definition) 15,550, or 25.37% of the population (61,290 on 31 December 2002). On 31 December 2017 there were 76,453 residents in Järfälla, of whom 22,215 people (29.06%) were born in a country other than Sweden. These are divided by country in the table below; the Nordic countries as well as the 12 most common countries of birth outside of Sweden for Swedish residents have been included, with other countries of birth bundled together by continent by Statistics Sweden.

Districts 
Viksjö
Jakobsberg
Barkarby
Skälby
Kallhäll
Stäket

Sports
The following sports clubs are located in Järfälla:

Football clubs 
 AFC Järfälla
 FC Järfälla
 FC Järfälla Academy
 IFK Viksjö
 Bele Barkarby FF
 Kallhälls FF
 Järfälla FF
 IF Söderhöjden Wasa

Floorball clubs 

 Jakobsbergs IBF
 Järfälla Spiders
 Stäkets IF
 Bele Barkarby IF

Basketball clubs 

Järfälla Basket

Ice hockey clubs 

 Järfälla HC
 Kallhälls IF
 Bele Barkarby IF

See also
Elfa AB (1945)
Old Environmental Party in Järfälla

References

External links 

Järfälla Municipality - Official site

Municipalities of Stockholm County
Metropolitan Stockholm
Stockholm urban area
Municipal seats of Stockholm County
Swedish municipal seats
Populated places in Stockholm County